Rianxo is a port town  and municipality in the autonomous community of Galicia in northwestern Spain in the province of A Coruña. It has a population of a little over 15,000 and its two main industries are fishing and tourism. The town's yearly celebration of Our Lady of Guadalupe is popular with tourists. Rianxo was the birthplace of several influential Galician writers, including  Paio Gómez Chariño gl, Manuel Antonio, Alfonso R. Castelao and Rafael Dieste.

List of parishes 
It has 6 parroquiasgl
 O Arañogl
 Asadosgl
 Isorna gl
 Leiro gl
 Rianxo gl
 Taragoña gl

References

External links

  web page of the municipality of Rianxo

Municipalities in the Province of A Coruña
Our Lady of Guadalupe